Farmers and Mechanics Savings (sometimes abbreviated as F&M Bank) or variations such as Farmers and Mechanics Savings Bank may refer to:

 Farmers and Mechanics Bank (Middletown, Connecticut)
 Farmers and Mechanics Savings Bank (1891), Minneapolis, Minnesota, now Scheik's Palace Royale
 Farmers and Mechanics Savings Bank (1942), Minneapolis, Minnesota, now a Westin Hotel
 Mechanics and Farmers Bank, Durham, North Carolina
 Farmers and Mechanics National Bank (Fort Worth), Texas
 Farmers and Mechanics Bank (Georgetown), Washington, D.C.

See also
Farmers and Merchants Bank (disambiguation)